Rare Masters is a compilation album by Elton John that was released in 1992. It includes all A-side and B-sides released by John between 1968 and 1975 that were not included on original studio albums or on Elton John's Greatest Hits Volume II. However, some of the tracks here previously appeared on the To Be Continued... box set released in 1990.

The album also includes five outtakes, recorded in the same time period, that had previously been unreleased. It is also the only place where the soundtrack to the 1971 movie Friends has been made available on CD.

When the Elton John back catalog from 1969 to 1975 was remastered and released in 1995, many of these songs were released on those albums as well, also in remastered form.

Track listing 
All songs written by Elton John and Bernie Taupin, except where noted.

References

Albums produced by Gus Dudgeon
B-side compilation albums
1992 compilation albums
Elton John compilation albums
Polydor Records compilation albums
Albums recorded at Trident Studios